Chabrol is the surname of:

 Claude Chabrol (1930–2010), French film director
 Henri Chabrol (1897–1981), French writer
 Gaspard de Chabrol (1773–1843), French prefect and member of the Chamber of Deputies
 Thomas Chabrol (born 1963), French actor, director and screenwriter

Surnames of French origin